American Electric may refer to:

American Electric (1899 automobile)
American Electric (1913 automobile)
American Electric Power, a major investor-owner electric utility in various parts of the US
American Electric Corporation, a company that manufactured electronic appliances and devices in Culver City, California